Ivo den Bieman (born 4 February 1967 in Wamel, Gelderland) is a Dutch retired footballer who played the majority of his career in Scotland. He moved to Scotland in 1990 to attend Aberdeen University having previously played for Dutch amateur side SV Leones.

Club career
He was signed by Montrose in 1990 and helped the club to promotion to the Scottish First Division in his first season. The club were relegated the following season but after impressing in the final game of the season against promoted club Dundee, Den Bieman was signed by the Premier Division newcomers in the summer of 1992. He remained at Dens Park for just one season before moving back to the First Division with Dunfermline Athletic. Whilst at Dunfermline, he formed a partnership with Hamish French, many calling them 'Fish & Chips' because you couldn't think of one without the other. Initially signed as a right-winger, Den Bieman found himself playing a variety of positions including full-back and centre-half. With his versatility and famed long throw's he soon gained cult status with the Pars support and was voted runner up in a recent poll of Dunfermline's all time cult heroes.

Den Bieman remained at Dunfermline for five years, helping them to promotion in 1995-96. He was released in 1998 and had spells with Ross County and Falkirk before retiring in 2000.

After returning to the Netherlands he continued to play in the Dutch amateur leagues for Bennekom whilst working in security.

Later years
He worked in the retail business and was teammanager at Bennekom. He also coached youth teams of his first club Leones and was the assistant manager of their senior team in the 2016/17 season.

References

External links

Profile at Montrose official website

1967 births
Living people
People from West Maas en Waal
Association football midfielders
Dutch footballers
Scottish Football League players
Montrose F.C. players
Dundee F.C. players
Dunfermline Athletic F.C. players
Ross County F.C. players
Falkirk F.C. players
Alumni of the University of Aberdeen
Expatriate footballers in Scotland
Dutch expatriate footballers
Dutch expatriate sportspeople in Scotland
Footballers from Gelderland